Mohamed Keshavjee is an international cross-cultural specialist on mediation, with a focus on Islamic Law and Alternative Dispute Resolution (ADR).

Early life
Keshavjee was born in Pretoria, South Africa in 1945, to Indian parents, father Najrali Manjee Keshavjee, and mother Koolsam Kanji Kana.  Due to increasing political unrest and segregation in South Africa, his family felt pressured to leave Pretoria for Kenya in 1962, searching for a better life.  At first, conditions were better in Kenya, but that eventually changed with Idi Amin and, after returning to Kenya from England where he had obtained his law degree in 1969, Keshavjee found himself restricted from employment, even without pay.  In 1972 his family then relocated to Canada.  In his book, "Into That Heaven of Freedom" (with a foreword by Ahmed Kathrada, the second longest-serving political prisoner in the world after Nelson Mandela, Keshavjee describes the history of Indian migration to Africa in the 19th century and their struggles under Apartheid, using his own family's story as a backdrop, highlighting the early racial struggle of Mohandas Gandhi years before he gained the honorific of Mahatma

Achievements
In 2016, Dr Keshavjee was awarded the Gandhi, King, Ikeda Peace Award by the Martin Luther King Jr. International Chapel at Morehouse College, Atlanta, Georgia, for his work on mediation, peace and human rights education.  Keshavjee was the first Canadian and also the first Asian from Africa to be awarded this prize. At his acceptance of this prize,  Keshavjee gave the speech, "Cosmopolitan Ethics: How we treat each other in today’s globalized world". He lectures on mediation methods needed in the face of major upheavals due to rapid globalization, accelerated technological growth, and massive climate change. His book, Islam, Sharia and Alternative Dispute Resolution, deals with how Muslims engage with sharia customary practices and the laws of the United Kingdom. He has spoken on ADR at conferences in Europe, North America and Asia, and has trained family mediators in the EU countries and imams and pastors in mosque and church conflicts in the UK and the US, respectively.

Dr Keshavjee has practiced law in Kenya, Canada and the United Kingdom. He has spent three decades working with the secretariat of the Aga Khan in France on programs aimed at improving the quality of life of people in some of the poorest areas of the world through the Ismaili Imamat and the Aga Khan Development Network.

In December, 2021, Dr Keshavjee was appointed to the Steering Committee to celebrate the 50th anniversary of the Ugandan Expulsion of 1972.

Education and training
1969 Honourable Society of Gray's Inn London: Barrister at Law; 1970 Admitted as Advocate of the High Court of Kenya in Nairobi; 1976 LLB from Queen's University, Kingston, Canada; 1977 Admitted as Barrister and Solicitor and Member of The Law Society of Upper Canada at Osgoode Hall, Toronto; 1998 LLM (honours) School of Oriental and African Studies, London University; 2000 Masters in Law at the University of London, England; 2009 PhD School of Oriental and African Studies, London University Faculty of Law: Thesis "Alternative Dispute Resolution in a Diasporic Muslim Community in the United Kingdom".

Awards and honors
The Gandhi-King Award

Published works
  "Islam, Sharia and Alternative Dispute Resolution: Mechanisms for Legal Redress in the Muslim Community", published June 30, 2013, London, UK: IB Tauris & Co. 
  "Into that Heaven of Freedom: The impact of apartheid on an Indian family's diasporic history", Mohamed M Keshavjee, 2015, by Mawenzi House Publishers, Ltd., Toronto, ON, Canada. 
  "Understanding Sharia: Islamic Law in a Globalised World", by Raficq S Abdulla and Mohamed M Keshavjee, published October 31, 2018, 
  "Diasporic Distractions: New faces in new places", Kuala Lumpur, Silverfish Books, 2017, 212 p., 

Contributed chapters to:

  "Dispute resolution", In A. Sajoo (Ed.), "A companion to Muslim ethics", London/New York: IB Tauris, Keshavjee, M. (2002) 
  "Islam, Sharia and alternative dispute resolution: Mechanisms for legal redress in the Muslim community London", IB Tauris, Keshavjee, M. (2013) 
  "Cross- border family mediation. In C. Paul & S. Kieswetter (Eds.), International parental child abduction, custody and access cases", Frankfurt: Wolfgang Metzner Verlag, Keshavjee, M. (2013) 
  "Reflective learning from the training programmes of the Ismaili Muslim conciliation and arbitration boards globally", UK College of Mediators Journal (December), 23–8. Available at http://www.iis.ac.uk/view_article.asp? Keshavjee, M., & Whatling, T. (2005)

Book Reviews:

  "A Lawyer’s Odyssey: Apartheid, Mandela and Beyond", by Henry Brown (Otterley Press, Pietermaritzburg 2020), review By Mohamed M Keshavjee.

Personal life
In 1977, Keshavjee married Dr Amina Jindani  in Toronto, Canada.  Dr Jindani's life's work has been conducting clinical trials aimed at decreasing the length of time required to treat tuberculosis.

References

External links
  https://southasia.berkeley.edu/mohamed-keshavjee
  https://www.hcch.net/search-results#stq=keshavjee&stp=1
  https://ismailimail.blog/tag/mohamed-keshavjee/
  https://www.youtube.com/watch?v=l373Hy2KdfU
  https://pabasa.co.za/2021/10/24/justice-albie-sachs-in-conversation-with-dr-mohamed-keshavjee
  http://www.theamericanmuslim.org/tam.php/features/articles/keshavjee_mohamed/
  https://the.ismaili/global/news/institutional-news/mawlana-hazar-imam-appoints-new-iis-board-governors

Aga Khan Development Network
Canadian anti-racism activists
Muslim South African anti-apartheid activists
South African anti-racism activists
Canadian educators
Canadian expatriates in England
Immigration lawyers
Canadian people of Indian descent
Canadian Ismailis
Kenyan Ismailis
Indian political writers
20th-century Indian historians
Indian autobiographers
Ismailis
Muslim writers
Living people
Minority rights activists
People from Pretoria
Queen's University at Kingston alumni
Recipients of the Gandhi Peace Prize
South African expatriates in Canada
South African Muslims
South African people of Gujarati descent
Alumni of the University of London
1945 births
Writers about Africa